Frez may refer to:

Ilya Frez (1909-1994) Russian film director
Frez. Amédée-François Frézier
"Frez", song by Mogwai from Every Country's Sun